Pierre Billon (born June 15, 1937 in Geneva, Switzerland) is a novelist and screenwriter from Quebec.

His son Nicolas Billon is also a noted writer.

Bibliography

Novels
 L'ogre de Barbarie (1972)
 La Chausse-Trappe (1980)
 L'enfant du Cinquième Nord (Mamatowee Awashis) (1983)
 Le Livre de Seul (1983)
 L'ultime Alliance (1990)
 The Children's Wing (English translation of L'enfant du Cinquième Nord) (1996)
 Un Bâillement du Diable (1998)
 Dans le secret des Dieux (2008)

Screenplays (film)
 Battle of the Brave (Nouvelle-France) (2004)
 Daniel et les Superdogs (2003)
 Séraphin: Heart of Stone (Séraphin: un homme et son péché)(2002)

Screenplays (TV)
 Mémoires en fuite (2000)
 Que reste-t-il... (2000)
 L'enfant des Appalaches (1997)
 La présence des ombres (1995)
 Une Petite Fille Particulière (1995)

External links

1937 births
Living people
Writers from Geneva
Writers from Quebec
Canadian male novelists
Canadian screenwriters in French
Canadian television writers
Swiss emigrants to Canada
Canadian novelists in French
Canadian male screenwriters
20th-century Canadian novelists
20th-century Canadian male writers
20th-century Canadian screenwriters
21st-century Canadian novelists
21st-century Canadian male writers
21st-century Canadian screenwriters
Canadian male television writers